Teghoria is a village in the south-eastern part of Sunamganj District, Bangladesh. It is located in the fifth ward of Jagannathpur Upazila's Syedpur Shaharpara Union and nestles on the bank of the river Magura. It has a total population of 1,862 people; 973 being men and 899 being women.

History
Teghoria was home to three prominent  Sheikh Taluqdar  families many centuries ago. The village was named as such; Te meaning three (prefix) and ghor meaning house - the village of the three homes.

Education
Villagers send their children to the local Teghoriya Government Primary School which hosts 250 students. The Teghoriya Jame Masjid is also a notable large religious institution in the village.

Notable people
Dewan Mohammad Azraf, philosopher, writer, teacher and activist

See also
 List of villages in Bangladesh
 Jagannathpur Upazila
 Syedpur Shaharpara Union

References

Villages in Jagannathpur Upazila